Flying disc at the 2013 World Games was composed of one sport, ultimate. The competition was held from July 28 to July 30 in Cali, Colombia. The six teams participating were Australia, Canada, Colombia, Great Britain, Japan and the United States which became the champion.

Round robin

Standings

Matches

Third place match

Championship final

References

2013 World Games
Flying disc tournaments